Stuart Alan Newman (born April 4, 1945 in New York City) is a professor of cell biology and anatomy at New York Medical College in Valhalla, NY, United States. His research centers around three program areas: cellular and molecular mechanisms of vertebrate limb development, physical mechanisms of morphogenesis, and mechanisms of morphological evolution. He also writes about social and cultural aspects of biological research and technology.

Career

Stuart Newman graduated from Jamaica High School in Queens, New York. He received an A.B. from Columbia College of Columbia University in 1965, and a Ph.D. in chemical physics from the University of Chicago in 1970, where he worked with the theoretical chemist, Stuart A. Rice. He was a postdoctoral fellow in the Department of Theoretical Biology, University of Chicago and the School of Biological Sciences, University of Sussex, UK, and before joining New York Medical College was an instructor in anatomy at the University of Pennsylvania and an assistant professor of biological sciences at the State University of New York at Albany.

He has been a visiting professor at the Pasteur Institute, Paris, the Commissariat à l'Energie Atomique-Saclay, the Indian Institute of Science, Bangalore, the University of Tokyo, Komaba, and was a Fogarty Senior International Fellow at Monash University, Australia. He is a member of the External Faculty of the Konrad Lorenz Institute for Evolution and Cognition Research, Klosterneuburg, Austria and in 2015 was appointed editor-in-chief of the institute's journal Biological Theory. He is a director of the Indigenous Peoples Council on Biocolonialism, Nixon, NV and was a founding member of the Council for Responsible Genetics, Cambridge, MA, and of the editorial board of the Journal of Biosciences (Bangalore).

Newman's work in developmental biology includes a proposed mechanism for patterning of the vertebrate limb skeleton based on the self-organization of embryonic tissues. He has also characterized a biophysical effect in extracellular matrices populated with cells or nonliving particles, "matrix-driven translocation," that provides a physical model for morphogenesis of mesenchymal tissues. He is co-author, with the physicist Gabor Forgacs, of the textbook Biological Physics of the Developing Embryo (Cambridge University Press, 2005).

His work in evolutionary biology includes a theory for the origination of the animal phyla. This is proposed to have been driven by new physical morphogenetic and patterning effects set into motion when the products of the ancient developmental toolkit genes first came to operate on the multicellular scale in the late Precambrian-early Cambrian. The resulting forms were then "locked in" by stabilizing selection.

Newman has proposed a theory for the evolution of cell differentiation in animals. Based on a detailed consideration of gene regulatory components and processes that distinguish this group from all other forms of life, including their nearest holozoan relatives, he has suggested that the topologically associating domains found in the nuclei of metazoan cells had a unique propensity to amplify and exaggerate inherent physiological and structural functionalities of unicellular ancestors.

With the evolutionary biologist Gerd B. Müller, Newman edited Origination of Organismal Form (MIT Press, 2003). This book on evolutionary developmental biology is a collection of papers by various researchers on generative mechanisms that were plausibly involved in the origination of disparate body forms during the Ediacaran and early Cambrian periods. Particular attention is given to epigenetic factors, such as physical determinants and environmental parameters, that may have led to the rapid emergence of body plans and organ forms during a period when multicellular organisms had relatively plastic morphologies.

Newman has advanced a novel scenario for the origin of birds, the Thermogenic Muscle Hypothesis. Characteristic anatomical specializations of birds, e.g., bipedality, the capacity for flight, are proposed to be secondary to the hyperplasia of thigh and breast skeletal muscles that arose in compensation for the loss of several genes in saurian ancestors.

Newman has been an outspoken critic of proposed uses of developmental biology to modify human species identity, including cloning and germline genetic manipulation. In 1997, in order to encourage public discussion of these emerging technologies, he applied for a U.S. patent on a human-nonhuman chimera, a composite organism (like the "geep") arising from a mixture of embryonic cells of two or more species. Although the patent was ultimately denied, it raised Constitutional and moral questions and was the subject of numerous articles in the legal and philosophical literature. Newman's patent application has been credited with inspiring the provision in the Leahy–Smith America Invents Act of 2011 that "no patent may issue on a claim directed to or encompassing a human organism." His book, Biotech Juggernaut: Hope, Hype, and Hidden Agendas of Entrepreneurial Bioscience (Routledge, 2019), written with the historian M.L. Tina Stevens, describes the rise of the field of human-oriented biotechnology and presents the scientific case against engineering human embryos.

See also
Transhumanism: Feasibility
Transhumanism: Loss of human identity
Human chimera: Patenting

References

External links

1945 births
Living people
21st-century American biologists
Extended evolutionary synthesis
Systems biologists
Columbia College (New York) alumni
University of Chicago alumni
New York Medical College faculty
Scientists from New York (state)